Pomaulax japonicus, the Japanese star shell, is a species of sea snail, a marine gastropod mollusk in the family Turbinidae, the turban snails.

Description
The size of the shell attains 90 mm. The large, imperforate shell has a depressed-conic shape. It is pale yellowish. The six whorls are planulate above, and obliquely tuberculate-plicate. The periphery is expanded, compressed, carinated, bearing wide nodose spines. The base of the shell is planulate, with concentric tuberculate lirae. The white umbilical tract is, callous and depressed. The aperture is transversely dilated, subrhomboidal, and angulate.

Distribution
This marine species occurs off Japan and Korea.

References

 Alf A. & Kreipl K. (2011) The family Turbinidae. Subfamilies Turbininae Rafinesque, 1815 and Prisogasterinae Hickman & McLean, 1990. In: G.T. Poppe & K. Groh (eds), A Conchological Iconography. Hackenheim: Conchbooks. pp. 1–82, pls 104–245.

External links
 

japonicus
Gastropods described in 1844